Kayla Danielle Pedersen (born April 14, 1989) is an American basketball forward who is currently a free agent. She was selected 7th overall in the 2011 WNBA Draft. She was selected for the 2006 State Farm Holiday Classic all-tournament as a senior at Red Mountain High School in Arizona. After attending high school she went to Stanford University, where she had a highly successful career. She has a brother who is younger "Kyle Pedersen" who is a successful Science teacher at Gilbert HighSchool.

Career

High school
Pedersen went to Red Mountain High School in Mesa, Arizona. She led her team to a 5A-DI state title as a senior. She set records for 5A with 2,611 points, 1,444 rebounds, 434 assists and 304 blocks.

USA Basketball
Pedersen was a member of the USA Women's U18 team which won the gold medal at the FIBA Americas Championship in Colorado Springs, Colorado. The event was held in July 2006, when the USA team defeated Canada to win the championship. Pederson has 12 rebounds in the game against Brazil. She averaged 6.0 points per game over the course of the event.

Pedersen continued as a member of the USA Women's U19 team which won the gold medal at the FIBA U19 World Championship in Bratislava, Slovakia. The event was held in July and August 2007, when the USA team defeated Sweden to win the championship. She averaged 2.8 points per game.

Pedersen was named a member of the team representing the USA at the 2009 World University Games held in Belgrade, Serbia. The team won all seven games to earn the gold medal. Pedersen averaged 5.1 points per game, and was the team's third leading rebounder, with 6.4 per game.

In 2010, she led the NCAA in scoring, assists, and rebounds. She was a top 10 draft prospect.

Stanford
At Stanford, Pedersen was a huge contributor; Tara VanDerveer (the coach at Stanford) has complimented her many times. In her freshman year, the team reached the final four, Pedersen being a huge contributor, averaging 12.6 points per game. She also averaged 8.4 rebounds a game. She was named Pac-10 freshman of the year. She also set a Stanford freshman record by starting all 39 games. They eventually lost to UConn (Connecticut) in the final four, but Pedersen managed 17 points and 7 rebounds and received much praise from the fans. During her remaining years in college, the Cardinal reached the final four every single year, with Pedersen being a consistent stand-out contributor. UConn continued to be a huge barrier to success for them, but Stanford finally beat them on December 30, 2010. However, they then went on to lose in the final four to Texas A&M. Pedersen has set Stanford's career record in both games (150) and minutes played (4,762), and she is seventh in the all-time points list (1,941 points).

WNBA
Pedersen was selected 7th overall in the 2011 WNBA Draft by Tulsa Shock. Former head coach, Nolan Richardson, once called her the "female Larry Bird-type player".

Pedersen was traded to the Connecticut Sun for a 2nd Round Pick in the 2014 WNBA Draft on June 20, 2013.

Stanford  statistics
Source

Personal
Pedersen was born in Flint, Michigan on April 14, 1989 to Kelli and Gary Pedersen. Her father played basketball at Saint Mary's in California. Her family later moved to Fountain Hills, Arizona when she was six years old, where she still resides. She has one younger brother, Kyle.

References

External links
 
 WNBA profile
 Stanford Cardinal bio

1989 births
Living people
American women's basketball players
Basketball players from Flint, Michigan
Connecticut Sun players
Forwards (basketball)
Parade High School All-Americans (girls' basketball)
People from Fountain Hills, Arizona
Sportspeople from the Phoenix metropolitan area
Stanford Cardinal women's basketball players
Tulsa Shock draft picks
Tulsa Shock players
Universiade gold medalists for the United States
Universiade medalists in basketball
Medalists at the 2009 Summer Universiade